Transylvania is an adventure video game published by Penguin Software. It was released for the Apple II in 1982 followed by ports to the Atari 8-bit family and Commodore 64. A Macintosh conversion was published in 1984, then versions for the Amiga, Atari ST, and MS-DOS in 1985.

Plot

The player is on a quest to rescue Princess Sabrina from a countryside roamed by a werewolf, a vampire, a prankster goblin, a witch, and an alien spaceship. The game has a time limit (dictated to the player by a note encountered early on that reads, "Sabrina dies at dawn"), as the Princess is trapped in a coffin in the castle tower.

Reception
Gregg Williams reviewed the game for Computer Gaming World, and stated that "I refer to the Atari 520 ST version of Polarware's Transylvania. The story line is fine, but the game makes almost no use of the ST's extra colors, resolution, or speed."

The first game in the Transylvania series was well received, appearing in the Billboard and Softalk best-sellers charts and in The Wall Street Journal in a list of best-selling software. It received a Certificate of Merit in the category of "1984 Best Computer Game Audio-Visual Effects" at the 5th annual Arkie Awards. It is considered one of the best examples of the adventure game genre. ANALOG Computing disliked the Atari ST versions of the first and second games, stating that "There just wasn't much of a story line" and that the ideal player age was a young teenager, not an adult. Despite this, however, because of their low price and "excellent" production values, graphics, and parser, the magazine recommended the games for those seeking graphic adventures for the ST.

Reviews
 Casus Belli #16 (Aug 1983)

Legacy
An iPhone version of Transylvania was released on October 30, 2009 under the name Transylvania Adventure with retro-styled graphics.

References

External links
 Transylvania for the Atari 8-bit family
Review in Softalk
1984 Software Encyclopedia from Electronic Games
 iOS version
Review in Page 6
Article in ST.Mac
Review in ST.Mac
Entry in The Book of Adventure Games
Review in Antic

1980s horror video games
1982 video games
Adventure games
Amiga games
Apple II games
Atari ST games
Atari 8-bit family games
Classic Mac OS games
Commodore 64 games
DOS games
Fictional goblins
IOS games
Multiplayer and single-player video games
Penguin Software games
ScummVM-supported games
Transylvania in fiction
Video games about extraterrestrial life
Video games about vampires
Video games about witchcraft
Video games developed in the United States
Video games set in castles
Video games set in Romania
Werewolf video games